Thomas Eugene Grady (November 19, 1880 – April 5, 1974) was a justice of the Washington Supreme Court.

Biography
Grady was born on November 19, 1880 in Chippewa Falls, Wisconsin. He attended Chippewa Falls High School and the University of Minnesota Law School. In 1905, Grady moved to Yakima, Washington. On June 3, 1908, he married Alice M. Beane. They had three children.

Career
Grady was appointed a superior court judge in 1911 and served until 1917. In 1917, he became City Attorney of Yakima, where he was also a member of the City Council. He went on to be a member of the Supreme Court twice. First, from 1942 to 1945 and second, from 1949 to 1955. He was a Republican.

References

External links

Politicians from Chippewa Falls, Wisconsin
Politicians from Yakima, Washington
Washington (state) city council members
Justices of the Washington Supreme Court
Washington (state) lawyers
Washington (state) Republicans
University of Minnesota Law School alumni
1880 births
1974 deaths
20th-century American judges
20th-century American politicians
20th-century American lawyers